Francis Stevens was a pseudonym of writer Gertrude Barrows Bennett (1884–1948).

Francis Stevens may also refer to:

Francis George Stevens (1891–?), British civil engineer who founded Scouting in Sri Lanka
Paul Stevens (bobsleigh) (Francis Paul Stephens, 1889–1949), Olympic bobsledder
Frankie Stevens (Francis Stevens, born 1950), New Zealand entertainer and singer

See also
Frances Simpson Stevens (1894–1976), American painter
Frank Stevens (disambiguation)
Francis Stephens (disambiguation)